Derwentcote Steel Furnace, Rowlands Gill, near Newcastle upon Tyne, England, built in 1720, is an example of an early cementation furnace which produced high-grade steel. A Grade I listed building, it is part of an industrial and mining site that has been protected as a scheduled monument.

It was restored in 1990 by English Heritage.

References

Further reading

External links

 History and information at English Heritage
Information for teachers: English Heritage

English Heritage sites in County Durham
Ironworks and steelworks in England
Consett